Water Babies is a Silly Symphonies cartoon released on May 11, 1935, by United Artists. The cartoon was directed by Wilfred Jackson. It features nude babies playing games in and out of the water. The babies are all completely identical other than the color of their hair. The edited version of the cartoon eliminates some shots that feature nude baby bottoms as a sight gag.

This cartoon was followed in 1938 by a sequel short, Merbabies.

Plot
The cartoon begins with several water lilies opening to reveal water babies sleeping in each one. The babies immediately awaken and leap into the water, except for one reluctant, redheaded baby which is assisted by hard slaps on the bottom from his water lily. As the babies play, the redheaded baby is being dunked repeatedly by two others. He finally comes up bottom-first and the other two babies spank him back underwater. Then a trumpet sounds and the babies all ride swans, fish, or leaf boats to the shore where they swing on vines and play with animals. In one scene, three babies ride on frogs wearing chaps made from leaves and nothing else. In another scene, a baby torero, wearing only a green sash and an acorn montera, attempts to fight a very large frog, but the frog instead manages to pen the torero and bows in triumph to the audience. Finally the babies take another ride back to their lily pads, recite Now I Lay Me Down to Sleep, and lay down in their flower beds.

Voice cast
 Whistling: Marion Darlington
 Water babies: Leone Ledoux

Home media
The short was released on December 4, 2001, on Walt Disney Treasures: Silly Symphonies - The Historic Musical Animated Classics as a hidden easter egg found in the "Fables and Fairy Tales" section.

References 

 Water Babies at the Internet Movie Database

1935 films
1935 short films
1935 animated films
Silly Symphonies
1930s Disney animated short films
Films directed by Wilfred Jackson
Films produced by Walt Disney
American animated short films
1930s American films
Films based on works by Charles Kingsley